In astronomy, the Columba association is a nearby  Myr old stellar association. The association is named after the constellation Columba which contains many of the stars first recognized in the group.

Special interest
Stars in young associations are a popular target for professional astronomers. The stars are often surrounded by circumstellar disks, discs of dust and other planet forming matter around a young star, and young planets that still glow in the infrared spectrum, which makes it easier to directly image, using the light reflected off of the planets to obtain an image of the planets.

The group was at first not recognized as an individual group, but stars within the group were first assigned to the Great Austral Young Association (GAYA), because it showed similar movement and distance compared with two nearby groups. Only later it became clear that GAYA is subdivided into three groups: the Tucana-Horologium association, the Carina association and the Columba association.

The brightest star in the association is the massive star HD 32309, with a spectral type of B9Vann and an apparent magnitude of 4.90 . The association also contains several A-type and F-type stars, such as Omega Aurigae, HR 8799, 26 Geminorum and AS Columbae. It also contains several other variable stars, such as V1358 Orionis, RT Pictoris, DK Leonis, V909 Orionis and GJ 1284. The stars HD 30447 and HD 35847 are members of the group with directly imaged debris disks.

See also 

 List of nearby stellar associations and moving groups
 Argus Association
 TW Hydrae association

Footnotes

References 

Stellar associations
Columba (constellation)